Mr. Dolan of New York is a 1917 American silent drama film directed by Raymond Wells and starring Jack Mulhall, Noble Johnson and Julia Ray. It was shot at Universal City.

Cast
 Jack Mulhall as Jimmy Dolan 
 Noble Johnson as Thomas Jefferson Jones 
 Julia Ray as Alicia 
 Albert MacQuarrie as Count Conrad 
 Harry Mann as The King 
 Ernest Shields as Prince Frederick 
 Francis McDonald as 'Spider' Flynn 
 Grace McLean as Mlle. D'Orsay

References

Bibliography
 Robert B. Connelly. The Silents: Silent Feature Films, 1910-36, Volume 40, Issue 2. December Press, 1998.

External links

1917 films
1917 drama films
1910s English-language films
American silent feature films
Silent American drama films
American black-and-white films
Films directed by Raymond Wells
Universal Pictures films
1910s American films